Sanfebagar is a municipality in Achham District in Sudurpashchim Province of Nepal that was established on 18 May 2014 by merging the two former Village development committees Baijinath, Jalapadevi, Siddheswar, Mastamandau, Nawathana, Bhagyeshwar, Ridikot, Chandika. It lies on the bank of Budhi Ganga River. At the time of the 2011 Nepal census it had a population of 33,788 people living in 6,693 individual households. Sanphebagar is about 25 km north of the district headquarters of Mangalsen.

Transportation  
Sanphebagar Airport was out of operation since 2005. On 14th Oct, 2018 flights resumed after 13 years from the initiatives of former  mayor Kul Bahadur Kunwar.

References

Populated places in Achham District
Village development committees in Achham District
Nepal municipalities established in 2014
Municipalities in Achham District